Hortavie Mpondo (born 27 June 1992) is a Cameroonian actress, model, and comedian.

Biography 
Mpongo was born in Limbe, Cameroon in 1992. She obtained her baccalaureate at the College Sonara. In 2010, Mpongo moved to Douala to study biochemistry at the University of Douala. Her parents were not supportive of her career choice in acting, believing artists to be illiterates.

Mpondo began her career as a model, and was the face for the BoldMakeUp brand. She also posed for BGFIBank Group in Cameroon. For a period, she was represented by the agency Niki Heat Model Management. In 2017, she represented the Deidoboy streetwear brand during the Deidoboy Fashion Day at Alfred Saker College in the Deïdo district in Douala alongside other personalities such as Cameroonian television presenter President Tchop Tchop.

In 2017, she turned her attention to film acting. That year, Mpongo starred as Amanda, the sister of Cynthia Elizabeth in Le Coeur d’Adzaï, co-directed by Stéphane Jung and Sergio Marcello. She portrayed Samira, the elder daughter of an abusive chief, in Therry Kamdem's short film Elles in 2018. In 2019, she played Morelia in Dante Fox's short film The Solo Girl. She said this was the most difficult role of her career, and she began shoking for it. Mpondo played the lead in the romantic comedy Coup de foudre à Yaoundé, directed by the blind filmmaker Mason Ewing.

In addition to acting and modeling, Mpondo works as a graphic designer. She supports the Me Too movement.

Filmography
2017 : Le Coeur d’Adzaï as Amanda
2018 : Elles as Samira (short film)
2018 : Le Prince de Genève as Raïssa (short film)
2018 : Otage d’amour as Sylvie (TV series)
2019 : The Solo Girl as Morelia (short film)
2019 : La Parodie du Bonheur as Maelle (short film)
2019 : Coup de foudre à Yaoundé as Rose Young
2020 : Madame...Monsieur (TV series)

References

External links
Hortavie Mpondo at the Internet Movie Database

1992 births
Living people
Cameroonian actresses
Cameroonian female models
People from Southwest Region (Cameroon)